The sultan of Brunei is the monarchical head of state of Brunei and head of government in his capacity as prime minister of Brunei. Since independence from the British in 1984, only one sultan has reigned, though the royal institution dates back to the 14th century.

The sultan of Brunei can be thought of as synonymous with the ruling House of Bolkiah, with generations being traced from the first sultan, temporarily interrupted by the 13th sultan, Abdul Hakkul Mubin, who in turn was deposed by a member of the House of Bolkiah. The sultan's full title is His Majesty The Sultan and Yang Di-Pertuan of Brunei Darussalam.

Sultans

Uncertainties
The earliest historical record of the Sultans of Brunei is not clearly known due to the poor early documentation of Brunei history. In addition there has been an effort to Islamise the history, with the "official history" not matching up with verifiable foreign sources  The Batu Tarsilah - the genealogical record of the kings of Brunei - was not started until 1807. Therefore, much of the interpretation of history relied on earlier Chinese sources and legends. It seems that the early Sultanate of Brunei was dependent on Chinese support, and perhaps early Sultans were of Chinese origin. Furthermore, the earliest Sultans may have been practicing the Hindu or Buddhist religions, with early names indicating this origin.

See also
 Line of succession to the Bruneian throne
 Malay styles and titles

References

 
Sultans
Brunei